Montas Antoine (13 December 1926 – 1988) was a Haitian painter. He was born in Léogâne in 1926 and he painted colorful street scenes and rural scenes in his life, then died in 1988.

References

 

1926 births
1988 deaths
Haitian painters
Haitian male painters